Maria-Chapdelaine is a regional county municipality in the Saguenay–Lac-Saint-Jean region of Quebec, Canada. Its seat is in Dolbeau-Mistassini.

It runs from Lac Saint-Jean in the south to the deep interior of northern Quebec in the north.

Subdivisions
There are 14 subdivisions within the RCM:

Cities & Towns (2)
 Dolbeau-Mistassini
 Normandin

Municipalities (8)
 Albanel
 Girardville
 Notre-Dame-de-Lorette
 Péribonka
 Saint-Edmond-les-Plaines
 Saint-Eugène-d'Argentenay
 Saint-Stanislas
 Saint-Thomas-Didyme

Parishes (1)
 Saint-Augustin

Villages (1)
 Sainte-Jeanne-d'Arc

Unorganized Territory (2)
 Passes-Dangereuses
 Rivière-Mistassini

Transportation

Access Routes
Highways and numbered routes that run through the municipality, including external routes that start or finish at the county border:

Autoroutes
 None

Principal Highways
 

Secondary Highways
 

External Routes
 None

Demographics 
In the 2021 Census of Population conducted by Statistics Canada, the RCM of Maria-Chapdelaine had a population of 24,149 living in 10,967 of its 12,185 total private dwellings, a change of -2.6% from its 2016 population of 24,793.

In 2021, the median age was 50.0, as opposed to 41.6 for all of Canada. French was the mother tongue of 99.0% of residents in 2021. The next most common mother tongues were the related languages of Atikamekw and Innu at 0.3% total, followed by English and Spanish at 0.3% each. 0.3% reported both English and French as their first language. Additionally there were 0.1% who reported both French and a non-official language as their mother tongue.

As of 2021, Indigenous peoples comprised 6.8% of the population, and visible minorities contributed 1.1%. The largest visible minority groups in the RCM of Maria-Chapdelaine are Black (0.5%), Arab (0.2%), and Latin American (0.2%).

In 2021, 79.1% of the population identified as Catholic, while 13.6% said they had no religious affiliation. Jehovah's Witnesses were the largest religious minority, making up 0.6% of the population. Muslims were the largest non-Christian religious minority, making up just over 0.1% of the population.

Counting both single and multiple responses, the most commonly identified ethnocultural ancestries were:

(Percentages may total more than 100% due to rounding and multiple responses).

See also
 List of regional county municipalities and equivalent territories in Quebec

References

 
Dolbeau-Mistassini